Jo Fisher (née Graat; born 18 January 1962) is an association football player who represented New Zealand at international level.

Fisher made her Football Ferns in a 0–2 loss to Taiwan on 7 October 1982, and finished her international career with 14 caps and four goals to her credit.

References

1962 births
Living people
New Zealand women's international footballers
New Zealand women's association footballers
Women's association footballers not categorized by position